Sulabha Arya (born 15 July 1950) is an Indian actress in Hindi and Marathi film, television and stage industry. She is the wife of late veteran Indian cinematographer Ishan Arya and mother of cinematographer Sameer Arya and actor Sagar Arya. She is best known for her role of Shanti Masi in Sasural Genda Phool. She also portrayed Lakshmamma in Shyam Benegal's Amaravati ki Kathayein.

Career
Arya was part of the Indian television industry's first sitcom, Yeh Jo Hai Zindagi, aired in 1984. She played the role of Kanta Ben in the 2003 dramedy film Kal Ho Naa Ho. She played the role of the mother in law in television series, Yes Boss on SAB TV. She was last seen at SET SAB's Maddam Sir as Saira Begum.

Personal life
She is a Maharashtrian who married Ishan Arya (Irshad Ahsan). Her son Sameer Arya (married to Srishti Behl, the daughter of Ramesh Behl) is also a cinematographer, known for films like Koyla (1997), Koi... Mil Gaya (2003) and Shootout at Wadala (2013).

Television
1984 Yeh Jo Hai Zindagi as Mandira Bhattacharya
1998 Hum Sab Ek Hain as Buaji ( 1 episode)
1999–2000 Muskaan as Malti Bua
1999–2009 Yes Boss as Meera's mother
 2009–2010: Shraddha as Madhu Khurana
 1998-2001: Hip Hip Hurray as Mrs Sharma
 2010–2012: Sasural Genda Phool as Shanti Bajpai
 2015–2016: Begusarai as Badi Amma
 2019–2020: Ishaaron Ishaaron Mein as Geeta Shrivastava
 2021–2022 Zindagi Mere Ghar Aana as Santo Sakhuja
 2022      Maddam Sir as Saira Begum

Awards

References

External links
 

Actresses from Mumbai
Indian film actresses
Actresses in Hindi cinema
Actresses in Marathi cinema
Living people
20th-century Indian actresses
21st-century Indian actresses
Actresses in Hindi television
Screen Awards winners
1950 births